Sheep Island is an uninhabited grassy island of around , located just over  from the shore of Walney Island, opposite Snab Point. It is one of the Islands of Furness and is in the Borough of Barrow-in-Furness in Cumbria in north-west England. The island's geographic location is, using the British national grid reference system, .

Sheep Island is accessible on foot at low tide from either Walney, or from Piel Island - a distance of about a mile (approx. 1.5 km). The island is uninhabited and there is no shelter.  Between 1892 and 1922 it included a small isolation hospital located within a wooden building, which was erected by Barrow Borough Council at a cost of £257 but seldom used.

Islands of Furness
Uninhabited islands of England
Barrow-in-Furness